Hongling station, is a station on Line 3 and Line 9 of the Shenzhen Metro. It opened on 28 June 2011 and Line 9 platforms were added on 28 October 2016. Line 3 station is located on Hongli Road, Futian District. Line 9 station is located on Hongling Middle Road, the boundary between Luohu and Futian.

Station layout

Exits

References

Shenzhen Metro stations
Railway stations in Guangdong
Futian District
Luohu District
Railway stations in China opened in 2011